Nelson Aerts (born 25 April 1963) is a former professional tennis player from Brazil.  

Aerts was born in Cachoeira Do Sul, and found most of his tennis success while playing doubles.  He achieved a career-high doubles ranking of World No. 80 in 1990.

ATP career finals

Doubles: 3 (3 runner-ups)

ATP Challenger and ITF Futures finals

Doubles: 25 (12–13)

Performance timelines

Singles

Doubles

External links
 
 

Brazilian male tennis players
Sportspeople from Rio Grande do Sul
1963 births
Living people
Pan American Games competitors for Brazil
Tennis players at the 1991 Pan American Games
Tennis players at the 1987 Pan American Games
20th-century Brazilian people
21st-century Brazilian people